John and the Hole is a 2021 American coming-of-age psychological thriller film directed by Pascual Sisto and written by Nicolás Giacobone. A feature-length adaptation of Giacobone's short story, El Pozo, the film stars Charlie Shotwell, Michael C. Hall, Jennifer Ehle, and Taissa Farmiga. The film revolves around a boy who discovers an unfinished bunker in the neighboring woods of his home.

The film was selected for the 2020 Cannes Film Festival and had its world premiere at the 2021 Sundance Film Festival on January 29, 2021. It was released on August 6, 2021, by IFC Films.

Plot
A coming of age psychological thriller that plays out the unsettling reality of a kid (Charlie Shotwell) who holds his family captive in a hole in the ground.

Cast

Production
The film is the directing debut of Pascual Sisto, and was written by Nicolás Giacobone. The film is the first screen adaptation of Giacobone's short story El Pozo.

Principal photography for the film took place in Massachusetts (Lexington, Lincoln and Norwood). Filming began on October, 2019 and lasted 23 days. The soundtrack is by Italian composer Caterina Barbieri.

Release
The film was part of the official selection for the 2020 Cannes Film Festival. The festival did not take place in its physical form due to the COVID-19 pandemic. On a social network, Pascual Sisto confirmed that the film's release was postponed to 2021. In November 2020, the film appeared at Sundance Wish List by IndieWire Sundance Film Festival. The following month, Pascual Sisto was named by Variety as one of the ten directors to watch for 2021.

In January 2021, the film appeared on TheWraps, Screen Dailys, Hollywood Reporters and Deadlines list of the most popular films on sale at the Sundance Festival. John and The Hole also appeared on GQs (Mexico), Vogues (which was reported in Italy and the United States), IndieWires, Voxs, Chicago Readers, Harper's Bazaars, Vanity Fairs and USA Todays list as one of the most anticipated films.

The film had its world premiere at the 2021 Sundance Film Festival on January 29, 2021. It was released on August 6, 2021, by IFC Films.

Reception
On Rotten Tomatoes, 59% of 124 critic reviews are positive for the film, and the average rating is 6.10/10. The critics consensus on the website reads: "John and the Hole's enticingly unique premise and disquieting atmosphere are often at odds with a meandering story that prevents this thriller from fulfilling its creepy potential." On Metacritic, the film has a weighted average score of 61 out of 100, based on 22 critics, indicating "generally favorable reviews."

Accolades
The film won the Prix de la Révélation at the 47th Deauville American Film Festival and the Crossovers Prize at the Strasbourg European Fantastic Film Festival.

References

External links
 
 

2020s coming-of-age drama films
2021 drama films
2021 independent films
American coming-of-age films
American independent films
American psychological thriller films
Films based on short fiction
Films postponed due to the COVID-19 pandemic
Films shot in Massachusetts
IFC Films films
2020s English-language films
2020s American films
Films set in bunkers